Île Aganton is an island on the north coast of Brittany (France), adjacent to Île-Grande which is to the east. Its size is about 1 km west to east, and it has a maximum width of about 500 m. It is accessible on foot at low tide. It is in the commune of Pleumeur-Bodou (department of Côtes-d'Armor).

On the coast, Trébeurden lies to the south, and Trégastel to the east.

Details
There is no permanent habitation. Dunes cover much of the island; there is heather, and a small pine wood planted in 1920. There are two stone crosses, indication possibly of a burial ground from former times.

The island has three branches; at the ends of each branch there is evidence of past granite-quarrying. The main site of former activity is on the north-east branch, where there is the largest quarry on the island, ruined buildings, and a jetty for loading boats at high tide.

Gallery

References

Islands of Brittany
Landforms of Côtes-d'Armor